M. Adhyatma (25 May 1932-2 December 1999) was an Indonesian public health official who served as the country's minister of health between 1988 and 1993.

Early Life and Education 

Adhyatma received a Master of Public Health degree from the University of California, Berkeley, School of Public Health in 1974.

Health Minister 

As minister, he prioritized addressing the high cost of drugs and mandated the use of generic drugs at government-operated healthcare facilities. His policies reduced drug costs by 10–15 percent and were met with resistance by the pharmaceutical industry. He was praised for Indonesia's handling of the HIV/AIDS epidemic because the health ministry regularly published case counts, whereas other Asian countries often hid those figures.

References 

Health ministers of Indonesia
UC Berkeley School of Public Health alumni
University of Indonesia alumni